Wall High School may refer to:

Wall High School (New Jersey) — Wall, New Jersey
Wall High School (South Dakota) — Wall, South Dakota
Wall High School (Texas) — Wall, Texas